Åland's Autonomy Day (or Åland's Self-Government Day) is celebrated annually on 9 June in memory of Åland County Council's (since 1993 Åland's Parliament) first meeting on this date in 1922. Åland's self-government from Finland was established by the League of Nations in 1921, after the Åland Movement raised the issue of island reunification with Sweden.

Provisions on Åland's Autonomy Day can be found in the Provincial Act (1976: 26) on Åland's Autonomy Day. According to the Provincial Act (1992: 41) on the Åland flag, the Autonomy Day is the official flag day on Åland. On official flag days, the flag must be hoisted on a building, or in a dominant place next to a building, which houses the county's offices and schools as well as municipal institutions. The landscape's vessels equipped for traffic shall celebrate the flag in accordance with international usage.

On June 9, 2021, the 100th anniversary of self-government began, with the aim of celebrating Åland’s autonomy in a variety of ways throughout the year.

See also
 Public holidays in Åland

References 

National days
June observances
Culture of Åland